{{DISPLAYTITLE:C24H28O4}}
The molecular formula C24H28O4 (molar mass: 380.484 g/mol, exact mass: 380.1988 u) may refer to:

 Diethylstilbestrol dipropionate (DESDP)
 Riligustilide

Molecular formulas